William Dwight Holford, Sr. (June 12, 1919, Bartlesville, Oklahoma – March 22, 1999, Houston) was an American recording engineer and record producer.  For 44 of those years, from 1948 to 1982, he was the affiliated with ACA Studios (Audio Company of America) in Houston as an owner, partner, and audio engineer.
Holford also helped build studios for several labels, including Duke/Peacock, Starday, Sarg Records, and Trumpet Records.

ACA Studios
ACA was one of the earliest multi-track analog recording studios in the country.

ACA recording artists
 Johnny Ace
 Chet Atkins
 Bobby Bland
 Bill Blevins 
 Juke Boy Bonner
 Clarence "Gatemouth" Brown
 Jewel "Teasin'" Brown
 Goree Carter 
 Harry Choates
 Arnett Cobb
 Johnny Copeland
 David Honeyboy Edwards
 Five Blind Boys of Mississippi
 Lefty Frizzell
 Clarence Garlow
 Mickey Gilley
 Rosco Gordon
 Peppermint Harris
 Smokey Hogg
 Lightnin' Hopkins
 Ivory Joe Hunter
 Elmore James
 B.B. King
 The Kingston Trio
 Willie Love
 Frankie Miller 
 Willie Nelson
 Eddie Noack
 Junior Parker 
 Webb Pierce
 Really Red
 Little Richard
 Buster Pickens
 Jimmy Swan
 B.J. Thomas
 Big Mama Thornton
 Mitchell Torok
 Ernest Tubb and His Texas Troubadours
 Big Joe Turner
 T-Bone Walker
 Tag Williams
 Sonny Boy Williamson (aka Alex Miller)
 Hop Wilson 
 Johnny Winter
 Justin Wilson

Labels that recorded at ACA
 Starday Records
 Mercury Records
 Peacock Records
 D Records
 Macy's Recordings
 ACA Records
 Arcadia 
 Arhoolie
 Ayo
 Bellaire Records 
 Columbia 
 Cullum 
 Decca
 De Luxe
 Delta Records
 Duke
 Excelsior
 FBC
 Freedom
 Herald 
 H.M. Crowe 
 Humble 
 Imperial 
 Kessler
 Martin
 MGM
 Natural 
 Opera Record Company 
 Paula Records 
 Phamous 
 RCA
 Revel 
 Royalty
 Sarg Records 
 Special Edition 
 Trumpet

Filmography
 Killing Fields (1984)

ACA audio engineers and staff
 Kay Holford (Kathleen Assaf Holford, Bill’s wife) had significant managerial responsibilities for the entire life of ACA Studios.
 Hank Lam: 1968-1972; engineer
 George Holsomback; born 1947, engineer from 1973 - 1974, chief engineer 1974-1978. 
 Andy Bradley (born Andrew M. Bradley; 1951), audio engineer
 Sonny Ray Stolz (born Rae Roy Stolz; 1946), audio engineer and editor, among other things, helped Holford move from ACA's temporary location at Savoy Drive in Houston into the acquired defunct studios of Jimmy Duncan's Soundville at 8208 Westpark, Houston.  Soundville Studios was a division of Jimmy Duncan Productions, Inc.  Stolz worked for ACA from the summer of 1972 until early 1973.
 Bill Holford, jr.

References

External links
 Tribute to Bill Holford, Shroom Productions Online, Houston, Richard S. Patz (owner)

American audio engineers
Record producers from Texas
1919 births
1999 deaths
People from Houston
American country rock singers
American country singer-songwriters
Texas country music
20th-century American businesspeople
20th-century American singers
Singer-songwriters from Texas
20th-century American engineers
Country musicians from Texas
Early Recording Engineers (1930-1959)